Kosmos 48 ( meaning Cosmos 48) or Zenit-2 No.24 was a Soviet, first generation, low resolution, optical film-return reconnaissance satellite launched in 1964.

Kosmos 48 was launched by a Vostok-2 rocket, serial number R15002-01, flying from Site 31/6 at the Baikonur Cosmodrome. The launch took place at 09:50 GMT on 14 October 1964, and following its successful arrival in orbit the spacecraft received its Kosmos designation; along with the International Designator 1964-066A and the Satellite Catalog Number 00908.

Midway through its planned reconnaissance mission, the thermal control system malfunctioned, with the temperature inside the spacecraft's pressurised capsule increasing to 43 °C. As a result of the malfunction, the spacecraft was deorbited two days earlier than planned, on 20 October 1964, six days after launch. The return capsule, containing the cameras and film, was successfully recovered by parachute for recovery by Soviet forces.

References

Kosmos satellites
Spacecraft launched in 1964
Spacecraft which reentered in 1964
Zenit-2 satellites